JAMA Ophthalmology (formerly Archives of Ophthalmology) is a monthly peer-reviewed medical journal covering all aspects of ophthalmology. The editor-in-chief is Neil M. Bressler (Johns Hopkins School of Medicine). It is published by the American Medical Association, with which it has been affiliated since 1929.

History
The journal was established in New York in 1869 as the Archives of Ophthalmology and Otology, with a simultaneous German language version published in Karlsruhe, Germany, as Archiv für Augen- und Ohrenheilkunde; sometimes articles would be slightly different. The editors were Hermann Knapp (New York), who practiced both ophthalmology and otology, with greater emphasis on the eye, and the otologist Salomon Moos (Heidelberg). The journal obtained its current name in 2013.

Naming History

Abstracting and indexing
The journal is abstracted and indexed in:

According to Journal Citation Reports, the journal has a 2021 impact factor of 8.253, ranking it 3rd out of 61 titles in the category "Ophthalmology".

See also
List of American Medical Association journals

References
h7 irvsth @

External links

Ophthalmology journals
American Medical Association academic journals
Monthly journals
English-language journals
Publications established in 1869